Anja Reschke (born 7 October 1972) is a German journalist and TV presenter.

Life 
Reschke was born in Munich in 1972, then part of West Germany. She studied political science at the University of Munich. After a traineeship at Norddeutscher Rundfunk (NDR), she worked as a freelance journalist for various programmes.

In 2001, she began presenting the political television magazine Panoramaand the following year the show ZAPP. She also presents Wissen vor acht (Knowledge ante 8 PM).

In 2018, she won the Hanns Joachim Friedrichs Award and the Hildegard von Bingen Prize for Journalism.

In 2019, Reschke was appointed director of NDR's culture and documentation area. The same year, she received the Siebenpfeiffer Prize for her commitment to protecting and upholding the freedom of the press. With creating her own show Reschke Fernsehen in 2023 she gave up the position.

Filmography 
 2000: Politiker und die Zweitwohnungssteuer
 2000: Die Kohl-Rolle
 2003: Reach for the Stars as Katja
 2010: Das Märchen von der Chancengleichheit
 2011: Die Nacht der politischen Magazine
 2011: Das Lügenfernsehen
 2011: Die Biolüge
 2012: Energiewende: Größenwahn statt Megaplan
 2013: Unter Lehrern
 2016: Samira (short film) as journalist

Works 
 Pech gehabt. Versendet sich. In: Stephan Weichert (publisher): Wozu noch Journalismus? Wie das Internet einen Beruf verändert. Mit einem Geleitwort von Heribert Prantl, Vandenhoeck & Ruprecht, Göttingen 2010, p. 153 ff.
 Die Unbequemen. Wie Panorama die Republik verändert hat. Redline-Verlag, Munich 2011, .
 as editor: Und das ist erst der Anfang. Deutschland und die Flüchtlinge. Rowohlt Polaris, Reinbek bei Hamburg 2015, .
 Haltung zeigen! Rowohlt, Reinbek bei Hamburg 2018, .

References

External links 

 
 Anja Reschke at ress.de
 Panorama stellt sich vor: Anja Reschke at Panorama

German television journalists
Journalists from Munich
German television presenters
German women television presenters
German women television journalists
1972 births
Living people
Ludwig Maximilian University of Munich alumni
ARD (broadcaster) people
Norddeutscher Rundfunk people